Events during the year 2020 in Poland.

Incumbents 

 President: Andrzej Duda
 Prime Minister: Mateusz Morawiecki
 Marshal of the Sejm: Elżbieta Witek
 Marshal of the Senate: Tomasz Grodzki

Events 

6 July – President Duda signed a document with a presidential draft of the amendment to the Polish Constitution to ban gay adoption.
12 July – Andrzej Duda is re-elected as the President of Poland.
25 July – Minister of Justice Zbigniew Ziobro declared he would begin preparing the formal process for Poland to withdraw from the Istanbul Convention. He claimed the treaty is harmful because it "requires that schools teach children about gender in an ideological way" and that it "de-emphasizes biological sex".
6 October – Jarosław Kaczyński become deputy prime minister in the Mateusz Morawiecki government.
22 October – Poland's constitutional court rules abortion of fetuses with congenital defects is unconstitutional.
7 December – stated-owned petroleum refinery and distributor PKN Orlen acquired media and press company "Polska Press" controlling large number of regional media portals and several regional newspapers.

Deaths

January 
2 January – Bogusław Polch, comic book artist (b. 1941).
17 January
Lech Raczak, theatre director (b. 1946).
Stanislaw Stefanek, Roman Catholic prelate, Bishop of Łomża (b. 1936).

July 
6 July
Zdzisław Myrda, Olympic basketball player (b. 1951).
Marta Stebnicka, actress (b. 1925).{[Citation needed}]
10 July – Anna Stroka, literary historian, author and translator (b. 1923).

August 
 
 
 
 

4 August – Jan Strelau, psychologist (b. 1931).
5 August – Stefan Majer, basketball player and coach (b. 1929).
10 August – Dariusz Baliszewski, historian, journalist and writer (b. 1946).
14 August – Ewa Demarczyk, singer and poet (b. 1941).
18 August – Wojciech Karpiński, writer and historian of ideas (b. 1943).
22 August – Józefa Hennelowa, journalist and politician (b. 1925).

September 
 

1 September – Jerzy Szczakiel, speedway rider (b. 1949).
5 September – Marian Jaworski, Roman Catholic cardinal, Archbishop of Lviv of the Latins (b. 1926).

October 
 
 

17 October – Ryszard Ronczewski, actor (b. 1930).
18 October – Stanisław Kogut, politician and trade union activist (b. 1953).
19 October – Wojciech Pszoniak, actor (b. 1942).
20 October – Bogdan Józef Wojtuś, Roman Catholic prelate (b. 1937).

December 
1 December – Hanna Stadnik, Polish resistance veteran and activist (b. 1929).

References 

 
2020s in Poland
Years of the 21st century in Poland
Poland
Poland